La Gorce Island is an island within the city of Miami Beach in Miami-Dade County, Florida, United States. It is located in Biscayne Bay in the La Gorce neighborhood, in the area of the city referred to as North Beach. The island and surrounding La Gorce neighborhood were named after Miami Beach developer Carl Fisher’s close friend, John Oliver La Gorce, a renowned explorer, author, and president of the National Geographic Society.

References

Islands of Miami Beach, Florida